Plumtree railway station served  Plumtree in the English county of Nottinghamshire, on the Nottingham direct line of the Midland Railway between London and Nottingham, avoiding Leicester. The station is now closed, although the line still exists today as the Old Dalby Test Track.

History 
The station was opened for goods (1 November 1879)  & passengers (2 February 1880)  by the Midland Railway. The station was designed by the Midland Railway company architect John Holloway Sanders.

It also improved access to and from the iron-ore fields in Leicestershire and Rutland. Local traffic was minimal and Plumtree closed to passengers as early as 1949.

According to the Official Handbook of Stations the following classes of traffic were handled by this station in 1956: G, P†, F, L, H, C and there was a 1-ton 10 cwt crane.

In 1910, nine trains each way stopped at Plumtree Station. The earliest train to Nottingham was 7.02, and to Melton Mowbray 6.55. A passenger catching this latter service could expect to be in London St Pancras by 10.55 a.m. Sunday services were virtually non-existent, with only the morning milk train (7.49) to Nottingham (and no way of getting back that day!)

Stationmasters
George Thomas Bursnell 1879 - 1883
James C. Chidgey 1883 - 1886 (afterwards station master at Spondon)
William George Nutall 1886 - 1888 (afterwards station master at Kirkby Stephen)
John Walters 1888 - 1890 (formerly station master at Hykeham)
Edwin Charles Harvey 1890 - 1919
Walter Frank Gardner 1921 - 1932
Albert Henry Hemmings 1937 - 1939 (formerly station master at Dudbridge)
Herbert F. Wilson 1943 - 1951 (formerly station master at East Langton)
Arthur Nicholson 1952 - 1954
John Ingamells 1954 - 1959
Fred Saunders 1960 - 1965

Present day 
This was used initially for the Advanced Passenger Train project and, more recently, Class 390 Pendolino units. It was also used for testing London Underground trains 'S Stock' units.

The main station buildings have survived and have been converted into 'Perkins Restaurant'. A conservatory extension has been built on the platform and the former goods shed has been restored as a function room.

References

External links
 Plumtree station on navigable 1946 O.S. map
 Plumtree station scenes down the years

Disused railway stations in Nottinghamshire
Railway stations in Great Britain opened in 1880
Railway stations in Great Britain closed in 1949
Former Midland Railway stations
John Holloway Sanders railway stations